Edmond Enright (born 19 May 1975), known professionally as Mundy, is an Irish singer-songwriter and founder of the independent record label Camcor Records.

Biography
He released his debut album Jelly Legs in 1996 on the Epic Records label. The album included the song "To You I Bestow", which was featured on the best-selling soundtrack to Baz Luhrmann's film adaptation Romeo + Juliet.

In 2000, Mundy was dropped by Epic while working on his second album, The Moon is a Bullethole, which was about to be recorded. Although a four-track EP of that title was released, much of the material for the canceled album was eventually incorporated into 24 Star Hotel, Mundy's 2002 album.

24 Star Hotel was released on Camcor Records, a label Mundy himself set up, primarily funded by his royalties from the Romeo and Juliet soundtrack. Camcor Records is named for the River Camcor, a popular fishing spot, which runs through the town of Birr. The album contained the song "July", an ode to the joys of the Irish summer, which gained heavy airplay throughout the summer months and is, for Irish audiences at least, Mundy's signature tune. Along with "July" the album contained "Mexico" and with both receiving extensive radio play and some huge Irish festival appearances, 24 Star Hotel has gone on to triple platinum status in Ireland. He afterward guested with Lucinda Williams in Ireland.

In 2003 Mundy also contributed to Afro Celt Sound System's album Seed, and to Even Better than the Real Thing Vol. 1 with a cover version of the Shakira song Whenever, Wherever, with the two words in the title switched around.

In May 2004, Mundy released his third album, Raining Down Arrows, recorded with producer Mark Addison at The Aerie studio in Austin, Texas. It entered the Irish album chart at number 1. The album has since gone platinum in Ireland. He toured the UK with songwriting legend Jimmy Webb and continued to win over Irish audiences whilst making UK appearances with Richard Hawley and gaining Irish support slots with The White Stripes and Oasis.

In 2006 Mundy recorded a live album and DVD called Live & Confusion at Vicar Street, Dublin. It contains all his best-known songs such as "Gin & Tonic Sky", "Mexico", "July", "To You I Bestow", "By Her Side" and "Love & Confusion". The album also contained an encore of "Galway Girl", a Steve Earle penned song that Sharon Shannon had recorded with the author years before. The live version became a download hit in Ireland, and eventually a studio version was released, after it was popularised in a television and radio advertising campaign for Bulmer's cider. The studio version of the track reached number 1 in the Irish Singles Chart in April 2008 and stayed there for five weeks. It became the biggest single in Ireland two years in a row in 2007 and 2008. Mundy also recorded an Irish language version of the track, entitled Cailín na Gaillimhe, for Ceol '08, an Irish language compilation album released in 2008 to raise money for several Irish charities. Two years before, Mundy recorded an Irish-language version of his song "Mexico", entitled "Meicsiceo" for Ceol '06. Ceol '06 reached the Top 10 in the Irish Album Chart.

In 2008 Mundy continually guested with Sharon Shannon's Big Band alongside Damien Dempsey and Shane MacGowan, turning up at The Glastonbury Festival as well as touring Ireland and the UK.

In 2009 Mundy recorded his fourth studio album, Strawberry Blood, with Irish producer Joe Chester, and mixed a number of tracks with UK producer Andy Bradfield. The album featured contributions from Shane MacGowan and Gemma Hayes and was released worldwide on iTunes with a bonus download video. He guested with Mundy effect' Nina Persson's A Camp project at the academy in Dublin, and in 2009 saw he tour Ireland, Australia, and the UK. The album went into the Irish charts at No.14.

Camcor Records
Camcor Records is an independent record label founded by Mundy after he departed from Epic Records (Sony BMG) in 2000, four years after his first album. The company takes its name from the Camcor River, which flows through Mundy's hometown of Birr, County Offaly, Ireland. It is sometimes listed as "Camcor Recording" in industry publications.

Mundy has released three albums on the label: his second album, 24-Star Hotel, which has sold more than 25,000 copies in Ireland; his third album, the platinum-selling Raining Down Arrows; and more recently the live album Live & Confusion.

References

External links
Official site

Early career interview on Indie music webzine CLUAS.com
Mundy PR in Ireland
 October, 11th 2008, Rouen, France
 December, 19th 2009, Évreux, France
 December, 19th 2009, Évreux, France

1976 births
Living people
Irish  male singer-songwriters
People from Birr, County Offaly
Irish people of Swedish descent
21st-century Irish male  singers